There were two notable flash floods that occurred in New Mexico in 2015, along with several minor flash floods and flash flood warnings. The two notable floods are the following:

 2015 Philmont Scout Ranch flash flood, on June 27
 2015 Ghost Ranch flash flood, on July 7